Isometrus isadensis is a species of scorpion in the family Buthidae.

References

Animals described in 1983
isadensis